Lecithocera officialis is a moth in the family Lecithoceridae. It was described by Edward Meyrick in 1911. It is found in South Africa.

The wingspan is about 15 mm. The forewings are dark purple fuscous and the hindwings are rather dark grey.

References

Moths described in 1911
officialis